Apotropos (Heb. אפוטרופוס) is the term in Halakha (traditional Jewish law) for legal guardian; it is derived from the Greek ἁπότροπος, to prevent or restrain, and here means the "father" of minors or the "guardian" or "custodian" of another's affairs. The need for an apotropos arises with persons who are unable to take care of their own affairs, such as minors and adults who are mentally defective or absentees.
The term is carried over into contemporary Israeli law; see the Hebrew article.

External links
Apotropos, Jewish Virtual Library
Greek words and phrases in Jewish law
Jewish law
Talmud concepts and terminology
Law of Israel